The Italian record progression women's long jump is recognised by the Italian Athletics Federation (FIDAL).

Record progression

See also
 List of Italian records in athletics
 Women's long jump world record progression

References

Long jump W